Skritch is an Australian musician. He sings, plays drums, guitar, bass and keyboards and has been a member of The Long Johns, Gota Cola, Broken Head, Mary Trembles, Tex Perkins' Dark Horses, SKAM Artist and Ranger.

References

Australian songwriters
Australian guitarists
Australian drummers
Male drummers
Australian bass guitarists
Male bass guitarists
Living people
Year of birth missing (living people)
Australian male guitarists